Fall to Pieces may refer to:

 Fall to Pieces (album), a 2020 album by Tricky
 "Fall to Pieces" (Velvet Revolver song), 2004
 "Fall to Pieces" (Avril Lavigne song), 2005
 "Fall to Pieces", a song by Krystal Meyers from Krystal Meyers
 "Fall to Pieces", a song by From Satellite from When All Is Said and Done

See also
 "I Fall to Pieces", a 1961 song by Patsy Cline
 "I Fall to Pieces" (Angel episode), an episode of the American series Angel
 Falling to Pieces (disambiguation)